Mammaglobin-B also known as secretoglobin family 2A member 1 is a protein that in humans is encoded by the SCGB2A1 gene.

SCGB2A1 and breast cancer 

SCGB2A1 expression is highly specific of mammary tissue, and has been used for identification and detection of disseminated breast cancer cells.

References

Further reading

Human proteins